Mind Body & Soul Sessions: Live in New York City is the first video album by English singer and songwriter Joss Stone, released on DVD on 13 December 2004 by S-Curve Records. It was filmed during Stone's sold-out concert at New York City's Irving Plaza on 9 September 2004, with additional live vocals from performances at La Zona Rosa in Austin, Texas, on 24 April 2004 and at the House of Blues in New Orleans on 27 April 2004. The DVD includes songs from her first two studio albums, The Soul Sessions (2003) and Mind Body & Soul (2004).

Track listing
"Super Duper Love (Are You Diggin' on Me?)"
"Jet Lag"
"Don't Know How"
"The Chokin' Kind"
"You Had Me"
"Spoiled"
"Don't Cha Wanna Ride"
"Victim of a Foolish Heart"
"Less Is More"
"Right to Be Wrong"
"Fell in Love with a Boy"
"Some Kind of Wonderful"
"Dirty Man" (acoustic)

DVD bonus features
 Music videos:
 "Fell in Love with a Boy"
 Directed by Nzingha Stewart
 Produced by John Winter
 "Super Duper Love"
 Directed by David LaChapelle
 Executive produced by Rebecca Skinner
 Produced by Fred Torres
 "You Had Me"
 Directed by Chris Robinson
 Produced by Jill Hardin
 "Joss on the Road 2004" – never-before-seen mini-documentary filmed while travelling throughout the US and Europe
 Produced by Smith and Watson Productions
 Executive produced by Wendy Stoker
 Filmed by Paul Conroy and Chris Watson (Smith and Watson Productions)
 Sound by Paul Conroy and Wendy Stoker
 Directed by Wendy Stoker and Chris Watson (Smith and Watson Productions)
 Edited by Wendy Stoker and Chris Watson (Smith and Watson Productions) at The Gothic House, Totnes, Devon, England
 Out-takes from the filming of Mind Body & Soul Sessions: Live in New York City

Personnel
Credits adapted from the liner notes of Mind Body & Soul Sessions: Live in New York City.

 Joss Stone – vocals
 Raymond Angry – keyboards, vocals
 Done and Dusted – concert film producer
 Rachel French – line producer
 David Gilmore – guitar
 David Goldman – cover photography
 David Gorman – art direction, design
 Steve Greenberg – executive producer
 Steve Greenwell – engineering, mixing
 Caesar Griffin – drums
 Sasha Harford – make-up artist
 John Harris – engineering
 Brian Hendry – monitor engineering
 Ryan Huddleston – backline technician
 Pete Iannacone – bass
 Julie Jakobek – executive producer
 Hardi Kamsani – assistant
 Heidi Kelso – production
 Ellison Kendrick – backing vocals
 Bryan Leitch – lighting designer
 Artia Lockett – backing vocals
 Brian Magallones – hairdresser
 Marty Maidenberg – executive producer
 Michael Mangini – mixing, production
 Scott McClintock – assistant
 Michael McConnell – tour manager
 Steve McGuire – FOH engineering
 Annette Mitchell – production
 Chuck Mitchell – production
 Arthur Nakata – art direction, design
 Abel Pabon – keyboards
 Tom Perme – backline technician
 Brian Russell – mixing assistance
 Paul D. Spriggs – tour and production coordinator
 Ron Stone – manager
 Russell Thomas – director
 David Tockman – legal
 Amy Touma – creative management, marketing
 Antonia Williams – backing vocals
 Betty Wright – production
 Ken Wright – assistant

Charts

Weekly charts

Year-end charts

Release history

References

External links
 
 

2004 video albums
Joss Stone video albums
Live video albums
S-Curve Records albums
Virgin Records video albums